Christians are a minority in Borno State in Northeastern Nigeria. Christianity has a long history there. The Christian Association of Nigeria opposed the introduction of Sharia. 
An Anglican Diocese of Maiduguri exists.
Evangelical Church of West Africa is present in the state.
"Muslim fanatics" burned four churches in Damboa in 2000. Muslims killed at least 65 Christians and destroyed 57 churches in Maiduguri in 2006, allegedly due to the cartoons of Denmark. 
Christ Apostolic Church is, among others, present in Maiduguri. 
Muslim sect Boko Haram has been accused of hijacking Christians. The Church of Christ in Nigeria and Baptists are present in the state, too.

See also 
Nigerian sectarian violence

References

Borno State
Borno